Calle 11 is a station on Line 12 of the Mexico City Metro. The station is located between Lomas Estrella and Periférico Oriente. It was opened on 30 October 2012 as a part of the first stretch of Line 12 between Mixcoac and Tláhuac.

The station is located southeast of the city center, at the intersection between Avenida Tláhuac and 11 Street. It is built above the ground.

References

External links 
 

Mexico City Metro Line 12 stations
Railway stations opened in 2012
2012 establishments in Mexico
Mexico City Metro stations in Iztapalapa
Accessible Mexico City Metro stations